KDJS may refer to:

 KDJS (AM), a radio station (1590 AM) licensed to Willmar, Minnesota, United States
 KDJS-FM, a radio station (95.3 FM) licensed to Willmar, Minnesota, United States